HD 53705/53706/53680 is a star system that lies approximately 54 light-years away in the constellation of Puppis. The system consists of four stars in two binaries, making it one of the nearest quadruple star systems.

Component discovery

HD 53705 was discovered to be a visual binary very early on, owing to the brightness of the two components. The earliest observation in the Washington Double Star Catalog (WDS) dates to 1826 and was made by James Dunlop, stating a position angle of 119 degrees and a separation of 21.5 arcseconds for the companion. The two stars have moved very little relative to each other since, with the most recent measurement from 1999 stating a position angle of 126 degrees and a separation of 20.9 arcseconds. This is related to the nearby location of the system: a separation of 21 arcseconds translates to a physical separation perpendicular to the line of sight of approximately 480 AU, so the orbit of the stars lasts somewhere on the order of millennia.

The companionship of HD 53680 to the closer binary was recognised later, with the first measurement in the WDS dating to 1900. With a position angle of 337 degrees and a separation of 185.7 arcseconds, HD 53680 lies on the opposite side of HD 53705 when compared to B, and is about nine times more distant. This separation results in a physical separation perpendicular to the line of sight of 4390 AU, which is atypically distant for a stellar companion but still close enough to be strongly gravitationally bound.

While all three components have similar proper motion, HD 53680's proper motion as measured by HIPPARCOS is sizeably discrepant from the proper motions of the other two components. A clue to the cause of this is that HD 53680's Tycho-2 proper motion is different from the HIPPARCOS values, which indicates that the star is being perturbed by a close companion. A fit of the HIPPARCOS astrometric data found a weakly constrained fit found a period of 1500 days, an inclination of 180 degrees (a face-on orbit) and a semimajor axis of 30.6 milliarcseconds. The fit is weakly constrained because HIPPARCOS observations do not span the full orbit of the companion, but the fit does adjust HD 53680's proper motion to be consistent with the proper motion of HD 53705/53706.

The low inclination of HD 53680 B's orbit reduces the amplitude of the radial velocity variation that it caused on HD 53680 A. In this case, the effect reduced the minimum mass of the companion into the brown dwarf regime as deduced from observations with the CORALIE spectrograph. The spectroscopic orbit produces far stronger constraint compared to the astrometry-only orbit.

Stellar properties
HD 53705, with a spectral type of G0V, is a G-type main-sequence star that is slightly hotter, larger and brighter than the Sun. Meanwhile, HD 53706 and HD 53680 A are both K-type main-sequence stars, with spectral types of K0V and K5V, respectively. Both of these stars are substantially cooler, smaller and dimmer than the Sun.

The three stars with observed spectra in the system have similar metallicity values: [Fe/H] = -0.21 ± 0.03 and -0.28 ± 0.03 for HD 53705 and B, and [Fe/H] = -0.29 ± 0.08 for HD 53680 A. The average value, -0.26 ± 0.04, results in an iron abundance of 55 ± 5% solar, a value typical for field stars.

The sub-solar metallicity of the stars has the effect of heating up their chromospheres; Though HD 53705 has a mass that is approximately solar, its effective temperature is about fifty degrees hotter.

The kinematics of the stars, with large proper motion and radial velocity, suggests that the system is a member of the thick disk, the population of stars that comprise most of the older members of the Milky Way's spiral arms. This is supported by the parameters of HD 53705; the surface gravity of 4.34 is somewhat low for a G0V star, indicating that it is relatively old and moving towards the end of its main sequence lifetime - which, when coupled with the solar mass, mean that estimates for the star's age are approximately 9 billion years old, approximately twice the solar age. With a peculiar velocity of 75.7 km/s, The orbit of the system about the galaxy has an eccentricity of 0.31 and brings the system up to 151 parsecs away from the galactic plane - again indicative of a thick disk system.

Planet searches
Being bright, solar-type and nearby, HD 53705 and B are attractive targets for radial velocity (RV)-based planet searches.

HD 53705 was one of the 37 targets of the first RV-based planet search in the southern hemisphere, the ESO CES survey. This survey did not detect any companion with several Jovian masses out to a few AU. An extension of this survey to the HARPS spectrograph provides further constraint, suggesting that there are no Jupiter-mass companions out to about 5 AU.

HD 53705 can be presumed to be on the CORALIE sample, as it satisfies the criteria of parallax = ≥20 mas with error ≤5 mas, and spectral type between F8 and M1. HD 53706 fails the criteria due to the large error on its parallax, while HD 53680 satisfies them.

The two stars are also on the Anglo-Australian Telescope sample, which has found that they are stable to 4.5 and 2.9 m/s, respectively. This excludes the presence of giant planets at separations of a few AU around either star.

Notes

References

0264
053705
034065
2667
Puppis
G-type main-sequence stars
K-type main-sequence stars
Spectroscopic binaries
4
Durchmusterung objects